Ribbon was a Japanese pop group that consisted of Hiromi Nagasaku, Arimi Matsuno and Aiko Satoh.  It released its first single on 6 December 1989, and its final album before it disbanded on 18 March 1994. Its first single "Little Date" is best known as the second opening of the anime Ranma ½.

Discography

Albums
30 May 1990: 	LUCKY POINT 		
23 January 1991: 	WONDERFUL de Ikou!! 		
17 July 1991: 	Jessica 		
21 November 1991: 	Delicious Best of ribbon 		
18 March 1992: 	R753 		
17 July 1992: 	KNIGHT 		
20 November 1992: 	Hoshi no Ki no Shita de 		
18 June 1993: 	More Delicious - ribbon BEST II - 		
3 November 1993: 	Merry-Hurry 		
18 March 1994: 	ROCK'N'ROLL RIBBON - Merry-Hurry Kanzenban

Singles
 6 December 1989: "Little Date" c/w "1/2 no Ticket"
 11 April 1990: "Soba ni Iru ne" c/w "Circus Parade"
 25 July 1990: "Ano ko ni Yoroshiku" c/w "Bubble"
 14 November 1990: "Virgin Snow" c/w "Koko ni Oide"
 3 March 1991: "Taiyo no Yukue" c/w "Maybe OK!"
 26 June 1991: "Silent Summer" c/w "Lady ni Naritai"
 13 November 1991: "Sore wa Iwanai Yakusoku" c/w "Rakuen e Ikou"
 21 February 1992: "Deep Breath" c/w "Yasashii Uta"
 3 June 1992: "Taiyo ni Hi o Tsukete" c/w "Tadashii Heart no Yukue"
 2 September 1992: "S"ENSATIONAL WIND" c/w "Let's Go"
 2 December 1992: "Do You Remember Me?" c/w "Heartbreak"
 7 April 1993: "Be My Diamond!" c/w "Sotsugyou"
 6 October 1993: "Yoake Nante Iranai" c/w "Merry Hurry de Aishite"

External links
 Encyclopedia Idollica

Japanese girl groups
Japanese pop music groups